Roseira is a municipality in the state of São Paulo in Brazil. It is part of the Metropolitan Region of Vale do Paraíba e Litoral Norte. The population is 10,801 (2020 est.) in an area of 130.65 km². The elevation is 551 m.

References

Municipalities in São Paulo (state)